Stefanie Hubig (born 15 December 1968) is a German politician of the Social Democratic Party (SPD) who has been serving as State Minister for Education in the government of Minister-President of Rhineland-Palatinate Malu Dreyer since 2016.

Early life and education
Hubig was born 1968 in the West German city of Frankfurt am Main and studied law at the University of Regensburg.

Political career
Following the 2013 national elections, Hubig was appointed State Secretary at the Federal Ministry of Justice and Consumer Protection under minister Heiko Maas, in the coalition government led by Chancellor Angela Merkel.

Following the 2016 state elections, Hubig was appointed State Minister of Education in Rhineland-Palatinate. In this capacity, she has also been also one of the state’s representatives on the Bundesrat, where she serves on the Commit­tee on Cul­tur­al Af­fairsand the Commit­tee on Wom­en and Youth. She also chaired the Standing Conference of the Ministers of Education and Cultural Affairs in 2020.

In the negotiations to form a so-called traffic light coalition of the SPD, the Green Party and the Free Democratic Party (FDP) following the 2021 German elections, Hubig was part of her party's delegation in the working group on education policy, co-chaired by Andreas Stoch, Felix Banaszak and Jens Brandenburg. Amid the formation of the cabinet of Chancellor Olaf Scholz, she was mentioned by numerous news outlets as a potential candidate for a cabinet post; however, she remained in her role in Rhineland-Palatinate.

Other activities
 Stiftung Lesen, Member of the Board of Trustees

References

1968 births
Living people
Politicians from Frankfurt
21st-century German politicians
Women ministers of State Governments in Germany
Women government ministers of Germany
21st-century German women politicians